The SPCA 40T, also designated the SPCA VII, was a mailplane built in France in the late 1920s.

Design
The 40T was a high-wing monoplane of conventional layout with a thick-sectioned, cantilever wing. The flight deck and cargo bay were fully enclosed, and the latter could be adapted to seat five passengers. The fixed undercarriage consisted of divided main units with spatted wheels, plus a tailskid. Construction was of metal throughout.

The two 40Ts were followed by a single example designated 41T with more powerful Salmson 9Nc engines that first flew on 12 December 1931. Services Aeriens de Madagascar operated the 41T between Tananarive and Broken Hill (where the route connected with Imperial Airways).

Eventually, the 40Ts were fitted with this same engine, at which time they were redesignated SPCA 218.

Variants
 40T – initial production version with Salmson 9Ac engines (2 built)
 41T – version with Salmson 9Nc engines (1 built)
 218 – original 40Ts refitted with Salmson 9Nc engines (2 converted)

Operators
 Services Aeriens de Madagascar

Specifications (40T)

Notes

References

External links

Madagascar – Air services; historical pictures

1920s French mailplanes
SPCA aircraft
Trimotors
High-wing aircraft
Aircraft first flown in 1929